Bertrand Jestaz, 2 February 1939 in Fontainebleau, is a French art historian, specialized in French and Italian Renaissance and in French classical art.

Biography 
A student of the École Nationale des Chartes and the École du Louvre, he dedicated his archivist and palaeographer thesis to Jules Hardouin-Mansart (1962).

In 1980, he succeeded André Chastel at the Renaissance Art History chair at the École pratique des hautes études. Meanwhile, he was a professor at the Ecole du Louvre and at the École des chartes until 2003.

Jestaz was awarded the Prize XVIIe in 2009 for his biography of Jules Hardouin-Mansart.

Main publications 
1966: Le Voyage d'Italie de Robert de Cotte, De Boccard.
19771994: (collectif) Le Palais Farnèse, École française de Rome.
1984: L'Art de la Renaissance, Mazenod. .
1990: L'Hôtel et l'Église des Invalides, CNMHS-Picard.
1995: La Renaissance de l'architecture, de Brunelleschi à Palladio, collection « Découvertes Gallimard » (nº 242), série Arts. Paris: Gallimard.
1996: Architecture of the Renaissance: From Brunelleschi to Palladio, 'New Horizons' series. London: Thames & Hudson.
1996: Architecture of the Renaissance: From Brunelleschi to Palladio, "Abrams Discoveries" series. New York: Harry N. Abrams.
2003: (collectif) Art et artistes en France, de la Renaissance à la Révolution, Bibliothèque de l'École des Chartes, tome 161.
2008: Jules Hardouin-Mansart, Picard, 2 vol.

External links 
 Bertrand Jestaz on data.bnf.fr
  Bertrand Jestaz, Jules Hardouin-Mansart on Persée 

French art historians
Academic staff of the École pratique des hautes études
École Nationale des Chartes alumni
École du Louvre alumni
People from Fontainebleau
1939 births
Living people